Fujiwara no Sukeyo (84714 November 897) was an early medieval Japanese aristocrat and scholar best known for his compilation of List of Writings Currently Held in the Nation of Japan (Nihon-koku genzai shomokuroku ).

References
Footnotes

Works cited
 

847 births
897 deaths
Japanese nobility
Japanese academics
9th-century Japanese writers